Taekwondo at the 2015 African Games in Brazzaville was held between September 16–18, 2015.

Results

Women's Finweight -46kg

Women's Flyweight -49kg

Women's Bantamweight -53kg

Women's Featherweight -57kg

Women's Lightweight -62kg

Women's Welterweight -67kg

Women's Middleweight -73kg

Women's Heavyweight +73kg

Men's Finweight -54kg

Men's Flyweight -58kg

Men's Bantamweight -63kg

Men's Featherweight -68kg

Men's Lightweight -74kg

Men's Welterweight -80kg

Men's Middleweight -87kg

Men's Heavyweight +87kg

Medal table
As of September 18, 2015

External links 
"Results of All African Games Congo Brazzavile", African taekwondo union
«World ranking» (Ranking of september 2015, International federation of Taekwondo.
"Result of tournament (African games 2015)", Taekwondo data: World's largest Taekwondo Database

2015 African Games
African Games
2015